Lamap (former named Port Sandwich) is a village in Malampa Province on the Malekula island in Vanuatu.

Transportation
The village is served by Lamap Airport or Malekoula Airport.

Populated places in Vanuatu
Malampa Province